Alfred Krupa (Alfred Joseph Krūppa 22 July 1915 - 16 October 1989) was a prominent Yugoslavian and Croatian academic painter, inventor, sportsman and art teacher born in Mikolow now in Poland then in German Empire. Since 1943 he has lived in Croatia, Yugoslavia.

Resume
Krupa, the former pupil of famous Polish painter Józef Mehoffer in Krakow (finished his study in 1937), appears in archives of the International Tracing Service as the registered victims of Nazi persecution. He was forced laborer deported to Germany, while his sister Hilgard Marie was burned alive at the furnace of the Auschwitz K.C. on 1 February 1944 at the age of 25. Alfred Krupa's ancestry include persons of German, Polish and Jewish origin (multiethnic Silesian family).
In 1943 he has found himself in Yugoslavia, joined resistance forces, and became one of the 13 core artists of the Art of Croatian Antifascist Movement (he exhibited at the historic first Partisan exhibition held in Topusko in 1944 on the free territory of Yugoslavia)
In 1945 Alfred Krupa enrolled the Academy of Fine Arts in Zagreb (University of Zagreb) in order to formally defend and verify his academic level obtained at the academy in Krakow in 1937. He has successfully passed all examination requirements in the same year.
In 1979 he inspired and cofounded the Watercolor Biennale of Yugoslavia (BAJ), at the time very respected juried exhibition.

Comment
Some comments that Krupa was the first man who painted a classical oil on paper. In the summer of 1950 at Vrbnik, he hand-made a dive mask from truck tires and glass, a tube for breathing underwater, and tied himself and a painting stand to the sea bottom. Those works were exhibited in Zagreb in 1951, but have subsequently been lost. For that, his critics attacked him for being ‘too bizarre’ (ref. Interesting Engineering (website).

Literature
Encyclopedia of Fine Arts (1964) Yugoslav Lexicographic Institute-Zagreb, vol. 3, p. 256
Encyclopedia of Fine Arts (1987) Yugoslav Lexicographic Institute-Zagreb, vol. 2, p. 146
Croatian Encyclopedia of Fine Arts (2004), Lexicographic Institute Miroslav Krleža, vol. 4, p. 46
Journal of Contemporary History (1976) Institute for Contemporary History, vol. 8 p. 140
Mihajlo Ogrizović (1960), Educational and cultural work with adults in Croatia during the national liberation war Alliance of 'People's Universities' of Croatia, p. 106
Nada Šuica, Idris Čejvan, Drawings, Graphics and Watercolors from the National Liberation War (1963)
Edo Kovačević (1965) Visual Arts of the National Revolution, Museum of the Croatian People's Revolution
Vesna Jiroušek (1958) 20th Century Watercolor in Croatia, Yugoslav Academy of Sciences and Arts 
Mladen Iveković, Vjekoslav Bratulić (1970) Croatian Left Intelligence 1918-1945, Naprijed, p. 177
Karlovac Lexicon (2008) Školska knjiga and Edicija Leksikon, p. 241
Željko Sabol: Krupa, Alfred, Encyclopedia of Croatian Art, vol. 1, Zagreb, 1995, p. 488
Juraj Baldani: Chopin of Croatian Painting (exhibition catalog), Ulrich Gallery, Zagreb, April 4–24, 1996
Željko Marcijuš: Krupine romantične bilješke, in: Festival akvarela Hrvatske (exhibition catalog), Split, 1997

See also
Alfred Freddy Krupa

References

20th-century Croatian painters
Croatian male painters
Yugoslav painters
20th-century Polish painters
20th-century German male artists
20th-century German painters
People from Karlovac
20th-century painters
People from Mikołów
Yugoslav inventors
Polish male painters
1915 births
1989 deaths
20th-century Croatian male artists